Jane Stowe (née Greenwood) was a New Zealand artist.

Biography 
Stowe was a Nelson based painter, the third daughter of Dr. J. D. Greenwood. On May 31 1871, she married Leonard Stowe, son of William Stowe. They had two sons and two daughters. They lived at Tiakiwai House, Wellington for many years.

She was exhibited with the Fine Arts Association, Wellington from 1883 to 1884, the New Zealand Academy of Fine Arts from 1889 to 1931, and the Melbourne Centennial Exhibition in 1888. In 1885, she was award third place in hand-painted screen bellows, and first place in hand painted doors at the New Zealand Exhibition. In the 1887, Wellington Art Exhibition, she won a prize for hand painted door panels. She continued painting and exhibited up until her death, and was recorded in 1928, at 91 years of age, selling "Afternoon, Wellington Harbour" at the Academy of Fine Arts Exhibition.

Several of her watercolours are in the Alexander Turnbull National Library of New Zealand.

Stowe died in November 1931 in Wellington, New Zealand.

References

External links 

 Stowe, Jane, 1838?-1931 :Mokoia home garden. [ca 1900?]
 Tiakiwai House

New Zealand women artists
Year of birth missing
1931 deaths